Kells Castle or Kells Motte is a motte-and-bailey and National Monument in Kells, County Kilkenny, Ireland.

Location
Kells Castle is located just south of the Kells Bridge which crosses the Kings River, immediately behind Delaney's Bar.

History and archaeology

Motte-and-bailey castles were a primitive type of castle built after the Norman invasion, a mound of earth topped by a wooden palisade and tower. Kells motte was built on a gravel platform (possibly originally an island in the Kings River) by Geoffrey FitzRobert in the late 12th century. It was an important site for extending Norman colonisation and economic exploitation in the region, which was formerly the Gaelic Irish Kingdom of Osraige. It was abandoned by the following century when the focus of the town shifted to the bailey, and later to Kells Priory.

References

Archaeological sites in County Kilkenny
National Monuments in County Kilkenny